Diahann Carroll (born Carol Diann Johnson; July 17, 1935 – October 4, 2019) was an American actress, singer, model, and activist. She rose to prominence in some of the earliest major studio films to feature black casts, including Carmen Jones (1954) and Porgy and Bess (1959). In 1962, Carroll won a Tony Award for Best Actress in a Musical, a first for an African-American woman, for her role in the Broadway musical No Strings. In 1974 she starred in Claudine alongside James Earl Jones for which she was nominated for an Academy Award for Best Actress.

Her title role in Julia, for which she received the 1968 Golden Globe Award for Best TV Star – Female, was the first series on American television to star a black woman in a non-stereotypical role, and was a milestone both in her career and the medium. In the 1980s, she played the role of Dominique Deveraux, a mixed-race diva, in the prime time soap opera Dynasty. In 1997, she had a significant role in the acclaimed hit indie film Eve's Bayou. Carroll was the recipient of numerous stage and screen nominations and awards, including her Tony Award in 1962, Golden Globe Award in 1968, and five Emmy Award nominations. She died on October 4, 2019, from breast cancer.

Carroll was a part of and a major figure during the Golden Age of Hollywood.

Early years 

Carol Diann Johnson was born in the Bronx, New York City, on July 17, 1935, to John Johnson, a subway conductor, and Mabel (Faulk), a nurse. While Carroll was still an infant, the family moved to Harlem, where she grew up except for a brief period in which her parents had left her with an aunt in North Carolina. She attended Music and Art High School, and was a classmate of Billy Dee Williams. In many interviews about her childhood, Carroll recalls her parents' support, and their enrolling her in dance, singing, and modeling classes. By the time Carroll was 15, she was modeling for Ebony. "She also began entering television contests, including Arthur Godfrey's Talent Scouts, under the name Diahann Carroll." After graduating from high school, she attended New York University, where she majored in sociology, "but she left before graduating to pursue a show-business career, promising her family that if the career did not materialize after two years, she would return to college."

Career 
Carroll's big break came at the age of 18, when she appeared as a contestant on the DuMont Television Network program, Chance of a Lifetime, hosted by Dennis James. On the show, which aired January 8, 1954, she took the $1,000 top prize for a rendition of the Jerome Kern/Oscar Hammerstein song, "Why Was I Born?" She went on to win the following four weeks. Engagements at Manhattan's Café Society and Latin Quarter nightclubs soon followed.

Carroll's film debut was a supporting role in Carmen Jones (1954), as a friend to the sultry lead character played by Dorothy Dandridge. That same year, she was nominated for a Tony Award for Best Featured Actress in a Musical for her role in the Broadway musical, House of Flowers. A few years later, she played Clara in the film version of George Gershwin's Porgy and Bess (1959), but her character's singing parts were dubbed by opera singer Loulie Jean Norman. The following year, Carroll made a guest appearance in the series Peter Gunn, in the episode "Sing a Song of Murder" (1960). In the next two years, she starred with Sidney Poitier, Paul Newman, and Joanne Woodward in the film Paris Blues (1961) and won the 1962 Tony Award for Best Actress in a Musical (the first time for a Black woman) for portraying Barbara Woodruff in the Samuel A. Taylor and Richard Rodgers musical No Strings. Twelve years later, she was nominated for an Academy Award for Best Actress for her starring role alongside James Earl Jones in the film Claudine (1974), which part had been written specifically for actress Diana Sands (who had made guest appearances on Julia as Carroll's cousin Sara), but shortly before filming was to begin, Sands learned she was terminally ill with cancer. Sands attempted to carry on with the role, but as filming began, she became too ill to continue and recommended her friend Carroll take over the role. Sands died in September 1973, before the film's release in April 1974.

Carroll is known for her titular role in the television series Julia (1968-71), which made her the first African-American actress to star in her own television series who did not play a domestic worker. That role won her the Golden Globe Award for Best TV Star – Female for its first year, and a nomination for an Primetime Emmy Award in 1969. Some of Carroll's earlier work also included appearances on shows hosted by Johnny Carson, Judy Garland, Merv Griffin, Jack Paar, and Ed Sullivan, and on The Hollywood Palace variety show. In 1984, Carroll joined the nighttime soap opera Dynasty at the end of its fourth season as the mixed-race jet set diva Dominique Deveraux, Blake Carrington's half-sister. Her high-profile role on Dynasty also reunited her with her schoolmate Billy Dee Williams, who briefly played her onscreen husband Brady Lloyd. Carroll remained on the show and made several appearances on its short-lived spin-off, The Colbys until she departed at the end of the seventh season in 1987. In 1989, she began the recurring role of Marion Gilbert in A Different World, for which she received her third Emmy nomination that same year.

In 1991, Carroll portrayed Eleanor Potter, the doting, concerned, and protective wife of Jimmy Potter (portrayed by Chuck Patterson), in the musical drama film The Five Heartbeats (1991), also featuring actor and musician Robert Townsend and Michael Wright. She reunited with Billy Dee Williams again in 1995, portraying his character's wife Mrs. Greyson in Lonesome Dove: The Series. The following year, Carroll starred as the self-loving and deluded silent movie star Norma Desmond in the Canadian production of Andrew Lloyd Webber's musical version of the film Sunset Boulevard. In 2001, Carroll made her animation debut in The Legend of Tarzan, in which she voiced Queen La, ruler of the ancient city of Opar.

In 2006, Carroll appeared in several episodes the television medical drama Grey's Anatomy as Jane Burke, the demanding mother of Dr. Preston Burke. From 2008 to 2014, she appeared on USA Network's series White Collar in the recurring role of June, the savvy widow who rents out her guest room to Neal Caffrey. In 2010, Carroll was featured in UniGlobe Entertainment's breast cancer docudrama titled 1 a Minute, and appeared as Nana in two Lifetime movie adaptations of Patricia Cornwell novels: At Risk and The Front.

In 2013, Carroll was present on stage at the 65th Primetime Emmy Awards to briefly speak about being the first African-American nominated for a Primetime Emmy Award. She was quoted as saying about Kerry Washington, nominated for Scandal, "she better get this award."

Personal life 
Carroll was married four times. Her father boycotted the ceremony for her first wedding, in 1956, to record producer Monte Kay, which was presided over by Adam Clayton Powell Jr. at the Abyssinian Baptist Church in Harlem. The marriage ended in 1962. Carroll gave birth to her daughter, Suzanne Kay (born September 9, 1960), who became a journalist and screenwriter.

In 1959, Carroll began a nine-year affair with the married actor Sidney Poitier. In her autobiography, Carroll said Poitier persuaded her to divorce her husband and said he would leave his wife to be with her. While she proceeded with her divorce, Poitier did not keep his part of the bargain. Eventually he divorced his wife. According to Poitier, their relationship ended because he wanted to live with Carroll for six months without her daughter present so he would not be "jumping from one marriage straight into another." She refused.

Carroll dated and was engaged to British television host and producer David Frost from 1970 until 1973. In February 1973, Carroll surprised the press by marrying Las Vegas boutique owner Fred Glusman. After four months of marriage Glusman filed for divorce in June 1973. Carroll filed a response, but did not contest the divorce, which was finalized two months later. Glusman was reportedly physically abusive.

On May 25, 1975, Carroll, then aged 39, married Robert DeLeon, the 24-year-old managing editor of Jet magazine. They met when DeLeon assigned himself to a cover story on Carroll about her 1975 Oscar nomination for Claudine. DeLeon had a child from a previous marriage. Carroll moved to Chicago where Jet was headquartered, but DeLeon soon quit his job so the couple relocated to Oakland. Carroll was widowed when DeLeon was killed in a car crash on March 31, 1977. Carroll's fourth and final marriage was to singer Vic Damone in 1987. The union, which Carroll admitted was turbulent, had a legal separation in 1991, reconciliation, and divorce in 1996.

Charitable work 
Carroll was a founding member of the Celebrity Action Council, a volunteer group of celebrity women who served the women's outreach of the Los Angeles Mission, working with women in rehabilitation from problems with alcohol, drugs, or prostitution. She helped to form the group along with other female television personalities including Mary Frann, Linda Gray, Donna Mills, and Joan Van Ark.

Illness, death, and memorial 
Carroll was diagnosed with breast cancer in 1997. She said the diagnosis "stunned" her, because there was no family history of breast cancer, and she had always led a healthy lifestyle. She underwent nine weeks of radiation therapy and had been clear for years after the diagnosis. She frequently spoke of the need for early detection and prevention of the disease. She died from cancer at her home in West Hollywood, California, on October 4, 2019, at the age of 84. Carroll also had dementia at the time of her death, though actor Marc Copage, who played her character's son on Julia, said that she did not appear to show serious signs of cognitive decline as late as 2017.

A memorial service was held in November 24, 2019, at the Helen Hayes Theater in New York City.

Filmography

Film

Television

Theater

Discography 

 Diahann Carroll Sings Harold Arlen Songs (1957)
 Best Beat Forward (1958)
 The Persian Room Presents Diahann Carroll (1959)
 Porgy and Bess (1959) (with the André Previn Trio)
 The Magic of Diahann Carroll (with the André Previn Trio) (1960)
 Fun Life (1961)
 Modern Jazz Quartet — The Comedy (1962)
 Showstopper! (1962)
 The Fabulous Diahann Carroll (1962)
 You're Adorable: Love Songs for Children (1967)
 Nobody Sees Me Cry (1967)
 Diahann Carroll (1974)
 A Tribute to Ethel Waters (1978)
 The Time of My Life (1997)

Awards and nominations 

 2011: Inducted into the Television Academy Hall of Fame
 1992: Women in Film Crystal Award.
 1998: Women in Film Lucy Award
 2000: NAACP Image Award — Having Our Say: The Delany Sisters' First 100 Years
 2005: NAACP Image Award — Soul Food
 2016: Hollywood Legacy Award

Notes

References

Further reading

External links 

 
 
 
 
 
  Biographical video.
 
 
  
  Diahann Carroll's oral history video excerpts.

1935 births
2019 deaths
20th-century African-American women singers
20th-century American actresses
20th-century Baptists
21st-century African-American people
21st-century African-American women
21st-century American actresses
Actresses from New York City
African-American actresses
American film actresses
American musical theatre actresses
American stage actresses
American television actresses
Baptists from New York (state)
Best Musical or Comedy Actress Golden Globe (television) winners
Burials at Woodlawn Cemetery (Bronx, New York)
Deaths from cancer in California
New York University alumni
People from Harlem
RCA Victor artists
The High School of Music & Art alumni
Tony Award winners